Quirino station is an under-construction Manila Metro Rail Transit (MRT) station situated on Line 7. The station will be located along Quirino Highway in the barangays of Greater Lagro and Pasong Putik Proper, Novaliches, Quezon City.

After the Mindanao Avenue MRT Station in SM City Fairview, the rail link will turn right to Quirino Highway.

External links
Proposed Quirino MRT Station 

Manila Metro Rail Transit System stations
Proposed railway stations in the Philippines